Cryptopora may refer to:
 Cryptopora (brachiopod), a genus of brachiopods in the family Cryptoporidae
 Cryptopora, a fossil genus of bryozoans in the family Semicosciniidae, synonym of Semicoscinium
 Cryptopora, a genus of protists in the order Nassellaria, family unassigned, synonym of Cryptopera